Muhammad Ilyas Attar Qadri, known as Attar, is a Sufi Islamic preacher, Muslim scholar and founding leader of Dawat-e-Islami. He is based in Karachi, Pakistan. Qadri is the author of Faizan-e-Sunnat.

Family background 
His Kutchi Memon forefathers were from the village of Kutyanah in Junagarh, India. His father served the Hanafi Memon Mosque in Pakistan in various capacities for many years. After the formation of Pakistan, his parents migrated to Pakistan. They first came to Hyderabad and then moved to Karachi.

Biography 
Ilyas Qadri was born on 12 July 1950 in a Memoni family in Karachi, Pakistan. He is a Sufi scholar of the Qadri Rizvi order and founder of Dawat-e-Islami, a global organization of Sunnis spread over 195+  countries.

Qadri studied for 22 years from Grand Mufti of Pakistan Muhammad Waqaruddin Qadri at Darl Uloom Amjadia, Karachi.

Qadri is a leader and a founder of the Qadiri-yya, Rizviyya, Attariyya branch of the Qadriyya Sufi order. He has authored 30 books, including Faizane-Sunnat.

Dawat-e-Islami 
Dawat-e-Islami has contributed towards the promotion of Islamic education. It has established madrasas where children and adults learn and memorize the Quran, and Jamia-tul-Madina where the dars-e-nizami curriculum is taught. 

Dawat-e-Islami has departments including Islamic Jurisprudence, Madani Channel, Madrasa tul Madinah, Jamia-tul-Madina, Departments of Mosque Service, Madani Inamat and Madani Qafila.

Sufism 
Qadri became a student of Ziauddin Madani, a disciple of Ahmad Raza Khan. Fadlur Rahman and Waqar-ud Din authorized him in Sufism. Shariful- Haq Amjadi authorized him in all the four major Sufi orders, Qadiriyyah, Chishtiyyah, Naqshbandiyyah, and Suhrawardiyya. Amjadi also gave him ijazah to transmit ahadith.

Publications 
Along with Faizan-e-Sunnat, his publications include:
 Laws of Ṣalāĥ
 Priceless Diamonds
 Cure for Anger
 I want to rectify myself
 Method of becoming Pious
 Cure for Sins
 Test of the Grave

See also
Dar-ul-Madinah School System
Abdul Rashid Dawoodi(Sunni scholar from kashmir india (founder of Tehreek-e-Soutul Auwliya)
Maulana Bashir Farooq Qadri

References

External links
Dawat-e-Islami
 Maulana Ilyas Qadri

Dawat-e-Islami
21st-century Islamic religious leaders
Muslim missionaries
Memon people
People from Karachi
Pakistani clergy
1950 births
Living people
Founders of Pakistani schools and colleges
21st-century Muslim scholars of Islam
Sufi mystics
Poets from Karachi
Islamic television preachers
Pakistani religious writers
Pakistani YouTubers
Barelvis